Pitcairnia nematophora is a plant species in the genus Pitcairnia. This species is endemic to Venezuela.

References

nematophora
Flora of Venezuela